Sebastián Pascual Rambert (born 30 January 1974) is a retired Argentine football striker. He is the currently assistant coach of the Chile national team. He was born in the city of Bernal in the Buenos Aires Province of Argentina and is of French descent. In fact, his father, Ángel Rambert, was an Argentine-born forward who began his career with Lanús before transferring to Lyon in France, where he eventually played for their national team after gaining dual nationality.

In 1995 Rambert transferred from Independiente to Inter Milan. He arrived at the club along with fellow Argentine Javier Zanetti, but he did not enjoy the same success as his compatriot. After an entire season without making a single appearance in Serie A he then transferred to Real Zaragoza in 1996, where he finally received his first minutes in Europe.
 Rambert played only one season in Spain before returning to his homeland to sign with Boca Juniors. This move was followed by stints at River Plate, Independiente and then a return to Europe for a brief season in Greece with Iraklis. He returned to Argentina to sign with Arsenal de Sarandí, where he ended his playing career in 2003.

Since then, he has been an assistant coach to manager Ramón Díaz at Club América and San Lorenzo. He is one of the few players to have played for three of the "Big Five" clubs in Argentina: Boca Juniors, River Plate and Club Atlético Independiente.

Currently, he is the coach of Crucero del Norte.

Honours
 Independiente
Primera División Argentina: Clausura 1994

 River Plate
Primera División Argentina: Clausura 1997, Apertura 1997, Apertura 1999, Clausura 2000
Supercopa Sudamericana: 1997

References

External links
 Argentine Primera statistics
BBC Sport story about a potential transfer to Hearts

1974 births
Living people
Argentine people of French descent
Sportspeople from Buenos Aires Province
Argentine footballers
Argentina international footballers
Argentine expatriate footballers
Argentine expatriate sportspeople in Spain
Association football forwards
Club Atlético Independiente footballers
Inter Milan players
La Liga players
Real Zaragoza players
Boca Juniors footballers
Club Atlético River Plate footballers
Arsenal de Sarandí footballers
Iraklis Thessaloniki F.C. players
Argentine Primera División players
Expatriate footballers in Italy
Expatriate footballers in Spain
Expatriate footballers in Greece
Expatriate football managers in Chile
1995 King Fahd Cup players
Pan American Games gold medalists for Argentina
Pan American Games medalists in football
Footballers at the 1995 Pan American Games
Argentine football managers
Medalists at the 1995 Pan American Games
Crucero del Norte managers